Lee Hoffman, born Shirley Bell Hoffman, (August 14, 1932 in Chicago, Illinois – February 6, 2007 in Port Charlotte, Florida) was an American science fiction fan, an editor of early folk music fanzines, and an author of science fiction, Western and romance novels.

Career
In 1950–53, she edited and published the highly regarded science fiction fanzine, Quandry.  In November 1951, she began publication of Science-Fiction Five-Yearly, which has appeared regularly since then (the 2006 issue ran 58 pages). Hoffman used a gender-neutral name within science fiction fandom, and many believed that she was a man. In 1952, she 'came out' as a leading editor of the science fiction fanzine Quandry at the 1952 Chicago World Con. Briefly married to editor Larry Shaw from 1956 to 1958, she was the assistant editor on the science fiction magazines he edited, Infinity Science Fiction and Science Fiction Adventures. During that same time, she began editing and publishing her folk music publications, Caravan and Gardyloo, which found a readership through Izzy Young's Folklore Center as the folk music scene expanded during the late 1950s.

Hoffman won the Western Writers of America Spur Award for her novel The Valdez Horses (Doubleday, 1967). In Spain, John Sturges directed the 1973 film adaptation, The Valdez Horses/Valdez, il Mezzosangue (aka Chino), starring Charles Bronson and Jill Ireland. Under the pseudonym Georgia York, she wrote historical romances for Fawcett Books during the years 1979 to 1983.

In her autobiographical writings, she described the mid-1960s events that led to her Western novels:
Ted White became a very good friend. He was great company, interested in just about everything. He was an excellent artist and an expert in jazz and comic books as well as any number of other subjects. He'd started writing science-fiction professionally, and shared his enthusiasm, inspiring me to try writing a book myself. A Western came most naturally to me. It was a typical horse opera very much in the tradition of the Western paperbacks I'd enjoyed for so long. Don and Jo Meisner critiqued the manuscript for me. Ted read it and encouraged me to submit it.

Another friend, Terry Carr, was assistant to the editor, Don Wollheim, at Ace Books. Ace had a reputation for giving new writers a break. I submitted my manuscript to Terry. I hadn't yet gotten a response on it, when Terry phoned and asked me if I "had time" to write a comic Western. I had plenty of time, but wasn't sure I had the ability. Terry had faith that I did. I wrote some chapters and an outline. Ace bought it, and published it ahead of the action Western I'd done first. I couldn't think of titles, so Terry provided names for both of them, The Legend of Blackjack Sam for the comic one, and Gunfight at Laramie for the horse opera.

The literary agent, Henry Morrison, was a longtime fan. He handled Ted White and some other friends who had become professional writers. He accepted me as a client. With two sales, and another book in the works I quit working regular hours for other people.

She went on to write seventeen Western novels between the years 1966 and 1977 for several publishers—Ace, Avon, Ballantine, Dell, Doubleday, Dell, NAL/Signet—with various editions in Germany, Italy and the UK.

During that same time period, she wrote four science fiction novels: Telepower (Belmont, 1967), The Caves of Karst (Ballantine, 1969), Always the Black Knight (Avon, 1970) and Change Song (Doubleday, 1972). Her short stories include "Soundless Evening", published in Harlan Ellison's Again, Dangerous Visions (1972).

In 1987, Hoffman was presented the Rebel Award, a lifetime achievement award for a science fiction fan "who has done a great deal for Southern Fandom."

Death
She died in Port Charlotte, Florida of a massive heart attack on February 6, 2007.

References

External links
Caravan and Gardyloo in University of North Carolina's Southern Folklife Collection
"How LeeH & ShelVy & Max Shaped My World" by Joyce Katz
Lee Hoffman's autobiography
Quandry (full text of some issues)

Lee Hoffman and Cosplay 

1932 births
2007 deaths
20th-century American novelists
American folk music
American women novelists
American romantic fiction writers
American science fiction writers
Novelists from Florida
Western (genre) writers
Women science fiction and fantasy writers
Women romantic fiction writers
20th-century American women writers
21st-century American women